Felix Cappella (January 24, 1930 – February 26, 2011) was a race walker from Canada, who represented Canada at the 1968 Summer Olympics in Mexico City. He won the silver medal at the 50 km event at the 1967 Pan American Games, and bronze in the 20 km race.

References
 Profile at Sports-Reference.com
 Felix Cappella represented Canada at 1968 Games, obituary in the Midland Mirror, March 4, 2011
 Felix Cappella in the Midland Ontario Sports Hall of Fame

1930 births
2011 deaths
Canadian male racewalkers
Athletes (track and field) at the 1966 British Empire and Commonwealth Games
Athletes (track and field) at the 1967 Pan American Games
Athletes (track and field) at the 1968 Summer Olympics
Athletes (track and field) at the 1970 British Commonwealth Games
Athletes (track and field) at the 1971 Pan American Games
Olympic track and field athletes of Canada
Place of birth missing
Commonwealth Games competitors for Canada
Pan American Games silver medalists for Canada
Pan American Games bronze medalists for Canada
Pan American Games medalists in athletics (track and field)
Medalists at the 1967 Pan American Games